"Oh, Whistle, and I'll Come to You, My Lad" is a ghost story by British writer M. R. James, included in his collection Ghost Stories of an Antiquary (1904). The story is named after a 1793 poem of the same name penned by Robert Burns.

Plot
Parkins, the protagonist, is a young "Professor of Ontography" at Cambridge University, who when the story opens is about to embark on a golfing holiday at the town of Burnstow (a fictionalized version of Felixstowe, Suffolk), on the east coast of England. He has secured a room at The Globe Inn for the duration of his stay, though he is somewhat uncomfortable that the room will contain a second bed. At dinner in his College, an archaeological colleague asks him to investigate the grounds of a ruined Templar preceptory near the Globe, with a view to its suitability for a dig.

On his first day at Burnstow, after a round of Golf with Colonel Wilson, another guest at the Globe, Parkins proceeds to find and examine the site of the preceptory. He happens upon a hole in the masonry, in which he finds an ancient bronze whistle. As he returns to the inn along the desolate beach, he notes that "the shape of a rather indistinct personage" in the distance appears to be making great efforts to catch up with him, but to no avail.

After an evening meal at the inn, Parkins inspects the whistle while alone in his room. First clearing the hard-packed soil from the item onto a sheet of paper, he then empties the soil out of the window, observing what he believes to be a sole individual "stationed on the shore, facing the inn". Parkins then holds the whistle close to a candle, discovering two inscriptions on the item. On one side appears

of which Parkins is unable to make anything. The inscription on the other side reads "QUIS EST ISTE QUI UENIT", a Latin phrase which Parkins translates as "Who is this who is coming?" 
Upon blowing the whistle, Parkins notices  sudden surge of wind outside his window, and has a vision of a "wide, dark expanse at night with a fresh wind blowing", in the middle of which he sees a solitary figure.

Unable to sleep that night, Parkins experiences visions of a man desperately running and clambering over high groynes, while anxiously looking back. After the man collapses to the ground in exhaustion, Parkins sees the cause of his flight, "a figure in pale, fluttering draperies, ill-defined", moving in a strange manner and with incredible speed. Realising he is unable to dispel the visions, Parkins decides to read through the night, although when he attempts to light a match, he hears the sound of scurrying on his floor in the direction away from his bed, which he believes may be the sound of rats fleeing. Parkins then reads himself to a sound sleep, with the candle beside his bed still burning when he is woken the following morning.

As he prepares to leave the inn, Parkins is informed by a maid that both beds in his room appeared to have been slept in. The maid had already made both beds, explaining the sheets on the bed he had not slept in were "crumpled and thrown about all ways". Parkins supposes he must have disturbed the sheets while unpacking. He then leaves the inn to play golf with an acquaintance, Colonel Wilson, whom he tells about the whistle. The Colonel, who has "pronouncedly protestant views", says that he would "be careful about using a thing that had belonged to a set of Papists".  

Returning to the inn, Parkins and Wilson encounter a terrified boy running from it, who explains he has just seen a strange, white figure waving at him from the window of one of the rooms. Parkins realises from the boy's description that the room must be his own. Investigating, they find the room still locked, but find that the sheets on the unused bed are twisted and contorted.

That night, Parkins is woken from sleep by the collapse of an improvised partition that he had constructed to block the moonlight. He sees a figure sitting on the unused bed, which causes him to jump from his own bed in the direction of the window, to retrieve his cane. As he does so, the "personage in the empty bed" moves into a position in front of the door, with arms outspread. This apparition remains stationary in the shadows for several moments as Parkins's fear escalates. It then gropes blindly about the room in a stooping posture,  darting towards Parkins's bed, and feeling about the pillow and sheets for his body. Realising he is no longer in the bed, the apparition moves into the moonlit part of the room; Parkins's impression is of "a horrible, an intensely horrible, face of crumpled linen".

Parkins lets out a cry of disgust, revealing his general location by the window. The figure moves rapidly at him, and he is backed half-way through the window, screaming, as its face is "thrust close into his own". Arriving just in time, Colonel Wilson kicks the door to his room open; before he reaches the window, the apparition tumbles to the floor, a heap of bed-clothes, while Parkins collapses in a faint. The following day, the Colonel removes the whistle and throws it into the sea.

Adaptations
The BBC has filmed the story twice as Whistle and I'll Come to You, firstly in 1968 in a version directed by Jonathan Miller and starring Michael Hordern, and again in 2010 starring John Hurt and Sophie Thompson.

Notes

References

External links

 
 Full text of Oh, Whistle, and I'll Come to You, My Lad steve-calvert.co.uk
 Oh, Whistle, and I'll Come to You, My Lad, narrated by Michael Hordern
 Fifteen-minute drama: Oh, Whistle, and I'll Come to You, My Lad as broadcast on BBC Radio 4
 British Theatre Guide review of stage performances of Oh, Whistle, and I'll Come to You, My Lad
 

1904 short stories
British short stories
Horror short stories
Novels set in England
Short stories adapted into films
Short stories by M. R. James